The 1934 Yukon general election was held on 17 September 1934 to elect the three members of the Yukon Territorial Council for Yukon, Canada. The council was non-partisan and had merely an advisory role to the federally appointed Commissioner.

Members

Dawson - Andrew Taddie
Mayo - Ernest Corp
Whitehorse - Charles Thomas Atherton

References

1934
1934 elections in Canada
Election
September 1934 events